Vanessa Hobbs (born ) was a British female artistic gymnast, representing her nation at international competitions.

She participated at the 2004 Summer Olympics, and the 2003 World Artistic Gymnastics Championships.

References

External links
Sports Reference
www.portsmouth.co.uk
YouTube

1987 births
Living people
British female artistic gymnasts
Sportspeople from Portsmouth
Gymnasts at the 2004 Summer Olympics
Olympic gymnasts of Great Britain
21st-century British women